UNC Medical Center (UNCMC) is a 905-bed non-profit, nationally ranked, public, research and academic medical center located in Chapel Hill, North Carolina, providing tertiary care for the Research Triangle, surrounding areas and North Carolina. The medical center is the flagship campus of the UNC Health Care Health System and is made up of four hospitals that include the North Carolina Memorial Hospital, North Carolina Children's Hospital, North Carolina Neurosciences Hospital, North Carolina Women's Hospital, and the North Carolina Cancer Hospital. UNCMC is affiliated with the University of North Carolina School of Medicine. UNCMC features an ACS designated adult and pediatric Level 1 Trauma Center and has a helipad to handle medevac patients.

History 
UNC Medical Center was first proposed in 1948 by Governor Robert Gregg Cherry when picking a location for the UNC School of Medicine. A 400-bed hospital was proposed to be built next to the medical school, and ultimately completed in 1952. The hospital only consisted of North Carolina Memorial Hospital until the new additions of the medical center.

North Carolina Memorial Hospital 
The first hospital in what later became known as UNC Hospitals and the UNC Health Care System was North Carolina Memorial Hospital, which opened on Sept. 2, 1952. North Carolina Memorial Hospital is the largest hospital in the medical center featuring 503 beds. The hospital also includes an adult Level 1 Trauma Center, Burn Center, and Stroke Center that treat over 70,000 patients annually.

In 2019 it was announced that a new 7 story, 335,000 ft2 tower would be built on the UNC medical center campus at a cost of $257 million. The new addition is set to house 24 operating rooms and dedicates 2 floors to 56 new ICU beds. The addition will also include reception areas on each floor and offices for staff.

Controversy 
The Joint Commission has put UNC Medical Center's accreditation status on probation after finding several problems with the medical center. The Joint Commission has said that problems include insufficient suicide screening assessments and lack of suicide resistant furniture in psychiatric health areas. The hospital has responded by issuing a statement that there was "no finding of any immediate threats to public health and safety."

Patient care units 
NC Memorial Hospital has a variety of patient care units to serve all types of patients.

 26-bed acute care (3 west)
 12-bed acute care (4 west)
 15-bed transplant unit (5 west)
 28-bed orthopedic and trauma (5 tower)
 31-bed pulmonary and infectious disease (6 tower)
 31-bed geriatric unit (8 tower)
 25-bed intermediate coronary care unit (3 anderson)
 20-bed acute care surgery (4 anderson north)
 12-bed cardio acute care (5 anderson)
 15-bed burn and wound (5 east)
 14-bed GI surgery (6 east)
 34-bed neuro acute care (6 neuro)
 13-bed antepartum unit (3 women's)
 28-bed maternity care (5 women's)
 22-bed gyn oncology (6 women's)
 13-bed cardio step-down unit
 13-bed cardiac intensive care unit
 9-bed cardiothoracic intensive care unit
 24-bed medical progressive care
 30-bed medical intensive care
 18-bed intermediate surgical care
 16-bed surgical and trauma intensive care
 16-bed neuro intensive care
 21-bed burn unit
 80-bed emergency department

Rankings

North Carolina Children's Hospital
North Carolina Children's Hospital (NCCH) is a pediatric acute care hospital located within UNC Medical Center in Chapel Hill, North Carolina. The hospital has 158 beds. It is affiliated with The University of North Carolina School of Medicine, and is a member of UNC Health. The hospital provides comprehensive pediatric specialties and subspecialties to infants, children, teens, and young adults aged 0–21 throughout North Carolina. North Carolina Children's Hospital features the only pediatric Level 1 Trauma Center in the region, and 1 of 3 in the state.

History 
The two buildings; the women's and children's buildings were unveiled on September 8, 2001, and officially opened in early 2002.

Patient Care Units 
In addition to the units at the neighboring adult hospital, UNC Children's has their own pediatric units for patients age 0-21.
 24-bed inpatient unit (6 children's) - General Inpatient Care
 24-bed Children's Intermediate Care Center (5 children's) - Severity Below ICU But Greater Than Inpatient Care
24-bed Pediatric Surgery Acute Care (7 children's) - Pediatric Trauma, Surgery and Burns. 
 58-bed Newborn Critical Care Center - Intensive Care For Neonates
 20-bed Pediatric Intensive Care Unit - Care For Critical Pediatric Patients
 8-bed Children's Short Stay Unit - Care For Patients Requiring Less Than 24 Hours Of Care

Heart surgeries 

In May 2019, it was revealed children with certain heart conditions had been dying at higher than expected rates after undergoing heart surgery at the hospital. The concern was raised in 2017 by multiple cardiologists employed at the hospital. The cardiologists repeatedly raised concerns about the cardiac surgery program and even began referring patients to other hospitals in the region. The cardiologists were concerned that the hospital was taking on cases that it could not handle. When the hospital released their mortality rates, the results showed that the hospital had a higher cardio surgery death rate than nearly all of the other children's hospitals nationwide. In July, the North Carolina secretary of health called for the investigation into the allegations raised by The New York Times. The hospital suspended its most complex heart surgeries to help restore confidence with the program; questions were also raised about the role of Dr. William L. Roper, then the head of UNC Health Care. The hospital made changes such as firing administrators and changing doctors. State and federal inspectors have since confirmed that the hospital's cardio program is very different than years ago. The hospital has since cautiously resumed complex pediatric heart surgeries.

Rankings 
The hospital is ranked nationally in 7 specialties and ranked #3 in North Carolina.

North Carolina Cancer Hospital 

The North Carolina Cancer Hospital is a public adult and pediatric cancer hospital. The hospital is the flagship site for UNC Cancer care and is the clinical home of the Lineberger Cancer Center. The 315,000 sq2 is the state's only public cancer hospital. The new hospital opened in 2009 to replace the former 60-year-old building that used to be a tuberculosis sanatorium. The center is one of 71 comprehensive cancer's nationwide and 1 of 3 in North Carolina. The new hospital was created with $180 million in funds from the North Carolina State government. The Cancer Hospital also includes a new Clinical Trials Unit allowing the hospital to access more than $147 million in grants from the National Institutes of Health that were previously unavailable. The hospital offers its pediatric services in conjunction with the adjacent N.C. Children's Hospital.

Facilities 

 101 examination, treatment, consultation, and procedure rooms
 65 inpatient beds for medical oncology and bone marrow transplant
70 chemotherapy infusion rooms
 1 CT Scanner and 2 General Radiology Rooms, 2 PET/CT Scanners
 21 new Emergency Department treatment spaces to supplement existing ED space in the N.C. Neurosciences Hospital
The facility features a telemedicine conference center

Patient care units 

 24-bed surgical oncology (7 neuro)
 34-bed general oncology (4 oncology)
 24-bed bone marrow transplant unit

Awards 
Grouped in with the UNC Medical Center, the hospital ranks #27 nationwide in cancer hospitals on the 2020 U.S. News & World Report hospital rankings.

In 2014 and 2017, Becker's Hospital Review ranked the hospital as one of the "100 hospitals and health systems with great oncology programs."

In 2016, Blue Cross and Blue Shield of North Carolina designated N.C. Cancer Hospital a Blue Distinction® Center+ in complex & rare cancers.

References

External links 

UNC Medical Center | Chapel Hill, NC
UNC Children's Hospital | UNC Health Care | Chapel Hill, NC

Hospitals in North Carolina
Level 1 trauma centers
Teaching hospitals in North Carolina
Hospital buildings completed in 1952
Hospital buildings completed in 2001
Hospital buildings completed in 2009